Amodeo is a surname. Notable people with the name include:

 Federico Amodeo (1859–1946), Italian mathematician
 John Amodeo, American television producer
 John F. Amodeo, (born 1950), American politician from New Jersey
 Mike Amodeo (born 1952), Canadian ice hockey player
 Orie Amodeo (1921–1998), American musician, member of the Lawrence Welk orchestra
 Santiago Amodeo (born 1969), Andalusian film director, screenwriter, musician and composer
 Thomas P. Amodeo (born 1951), American lawyer and judge
Dante A. Amodeo (born 1964), American Screenplay Writer, Musician, Disc Jockey, and Novelist from Jacksonville Beach, Florida

See also
 Amadeo (disambiguation)
 Amedeo, given name